Mohammed Rabii may refer to:
 Mohammed Rabii (boxer)
 Mohammed Rabii (footballer)